Nova Estrela (Portuguese for new star) is a village in the eastern part of Príncipe Island in São Tomé and Príncipe. Its population is 222 (2012 census). Nova Estrela is located 2 km southeast of the island capital of Santo António.

Nearby settlements include Portinho to the northeast, Terreiro Velho to the southwest and Bela Vista to the west.

Population history

References

Populated places in the Autonomous Region of Príncipe